The Accidental Tourist is a 1988 American romantic drama film directed and co-produced by Lawrence Kasdan, from a screenplay by Frank Galati and Kasdan, based on the 1985 novel of the same name by Anne Tyler. The film stars William Hurt as Macon Leary, a middle-aged travel writer whose life and marriage have been shattered by the tragic death of his son. It also stars Kathleen Turner and Geena Davis.

The Accidental Tourist was theatrically released in the United States on December 23, 1988, by Warner Bros. Pictures. The film received critical acclaim and grossed over $32.6 million. It was nominated for four Academy Awards, including Best Picture, with Geena Davis winning Best Supporting Actress. It was also nominated for two Golden Globe Awards, including Best Motion Picture – Drama.

Plot
Macon Leary (William Hurt) is a Baltimore writer of travel guides for reluctant business travelers, which detail how best to avoid unpleasantness and difficulty.

His marriage to his wife Sarah (Kathleen Turner) is disintegrating in the aftermath of the murder of their 12-year-old son, Ethan. Sarah eventually leaves Macon, moving out of their house and into an apartment, leaving him with the house and the family dog, Edward. 

Macon meets Muriel Pritchet (Geena Davis), an eccentric animal hospital employee and dog trainer with a sickly son. Macon eventually hires Muriel to put his dog through much-needed obedience training after Edward causes Macon to fall down the stairs and break his leg. Muriel is quite forward in her interest in Macon, which is a counterforce to his stiff personality traits.  Although Muriel at first seems brash and unsophisticated, Macon eventually finds himself opening up to her and trusting her. Over a period of time, he moves into her apartment and becomes a father figure to her sickly son. Some conflict begins to occur between Muriel and Macon when he offers to help with private school costs. She wants more commitment to the relationship and doesn't want another disappointing experience. When Sarah's apartment lease is up, she moves back into their old home and suggests to Macon that they start over. Macon leaves Muriel, and he and Sarah set up house once more.

When Macon visits Paris for research, Muriel surprises him by showing up on the same flight and stays in the same Paris hotel, recommended by Macon in one of his travel guides.  She suggests that they enjoy themselves as if they are vacationing together. Macon insists he is there strictly for business, and although he shows concern for how Alexander is doing, keeps Muriel at arm's length.

During Macon's last night in Paris, Muriel asks to go with him, and despite an early flight she tells him he doesn't have to reply just now. Waking up in the middle of the night Macon decides to call Muriel but his telephone malfunctions. Macon gets up and while trying to fix the cord, hurts his back and becomes bedridden. Muriel knocks on his door waking him up but before he can decide what to do Muriel assumes he has gone already and leaves. Mustering the strength to go to the front desk, Macon phones his publisher to inform him of his back pain. Sarah comes to Paris with pain medication, sent by Macon's sister Rose, to care and make day-trips for him in order to complete his travel guide. Sarah proposes that after finishing the day trips if he is feeling better they can go sightseeing,  reschedule the flight for a later date and make the trip a second honeymoon to which Macon tepidly agrees. However, Sarah tells him that she has run into Muriel when she arrived and continues to question Macon about his attraction to her. "Was it the boy? She asks." Despite the reconciliation attempts to save the marriage, Macon begins to realize that the relationship is stunted without their son. 

The next morning, Macon dresses while Sarah still sleeps, then wakes her to tell her that he is going back to Muriel. He says he needs to move on to someone that can get him out of mourning and his funk. Macon realizes that Sarah was strong enough to muddle through, but he needs Muriel. Walking to the taxi stand, Macon leaves his signature handheld bag in the streets. As he struggles to walk and catch a taxi, a young boy generously stops the cab and lets macon catch up. The boy is visually identical to his deceased son, and a metaphor for Macon to move on to his new life and family. The boy opens the door and wishes him well on his journey. He spots Muriel hailing a taxi and tells the driver to stop. Thinking the driver stopped for her, Muriel bends to gather her luggage and catches sight of Macon in the taxi. She smiles, and Macon returns the smile.

Cast

Reception
Roger Ebert praised the film, giving it four out of four stars.

On Rotten Tomatoes the film has an approval rating of 82% based on 33 reviews with the consensus stating, "Generous with its character's foibles and virtues, The Accidental Tourist is a thoughtful drama vested with insight into the complications of relationships". On Metacritic the film has a score of 53 out of 100 based on reviews from 12 critics, indicating "mixed or average reviews". Audiences surveyed by CinemaScore gave the film a grade B on scale of A to F.

Accolades

The film is recognized by American Film Institute in these lists:
 2002: AFI's 100 Years...100 Passions – Nominated

References

External links

 
 
 Interview with Geena Davis about the film at Texas Archive of the Moving Image

1988 films
1988 romantic drama films
American romantic drama films
Films about marriage
Films about writers
Films based on American novels
Films based on romance novels
Films directed by Lawrence Kasdan
Films featuring a Best Supporting Actress Academy Award-winning performance
Films scored by John Williams
Films set in Baltimore
Films set in Paris
Films shot in Baltimore
Films shot in Paris
Warner Bros. films
1980s English-language films
1980s American films